Cape Keltie is an ice-covered cape on the Clarie Coast of Antarctica,  west of Cape Cesney. The identification of this feature is based upon the G.D. Blodgett map of 1955, compiled from aerial photos taken by U.S. Navy Operation Highjump (1946–47).

References

Headlands of Wilkes Land